Quan Yi Fong (born 1 March 1974) is a Taiwanese-born Singaporean host and actress, who has since taken up Singaporean citizenship and given up her Taiwanese citizenship.

Career
Quan joined the SBC in 1992. In 1996, she was fired by TCS over a fight at a bowling alley and for driving without a valid license.

Quan joined SPH MediaWorks in 2000. When SPH MediaWorks merged with MediaCorp, she was transferred to MediaCorp, marking her return to the company after almost 9 years.

In Asian Television Award 2008, she obtained the Best Entertainment Presenter. In Star Awards 2005 & Star Awards 2014, she won Best Variety Show Host. She won Best Info-ed Programme Show Host at the Star Awards 2015. She won Best Programme Host from 2017 to 2019. She was nominated a total of 12 times for Best Programme Host.

In Star Awards 2017, Quan received the All-Time Favourite Artiste award after winning the Top 10 Most Popular Female Artistes award from 2005-2010, 2013-2016 respectively with Elvin Ng & Joanne Peh.

Controversy
In 1996, Quan was fined S$1,000 after a fight with a bowling alley assistant.

In 2010, Quan was accused of abusing a taxi driver. It was alleged that she was angry that the taxi driver did not help with loading her luggage onto the taxi and throwing her forward while stopping sharply at a junction. She supposedly alighted, kicked the car door and then kicked the taxi driver in the groin. She subsequently locked herself in the taxi and messed the taxi up. She had hired Subhas Anandan to represent her after the incident. She was charged with two counts of mischief and one count of using criminal force.

On 29 December 2011, Quan Yi Feng was sentenced to 15 months' probation in court. Quan was charged with damaging a taxi meter, pulling out the receipt printer of a cab and spilling water on the receipt printer. Two other charges—of kicking the right passenger door of the taxi, and pushing and attempting to kick the 53-year-old taxi driver—were also taken into consideration.

She had to attend psychological therapy and counselling sessions as part of her probation.

In July 2013, Quan had a brush with the law once again when she knocked down a pedestrian at a crossing. Quan pleaded guilty to one count of inconsiderate driving under the Road Traffic Act and was fined S$800 and banned from driving for three months.

Personal life
Quan married former MediaCorp actor Peter Yu in 1998 after meeting while filming the television series Happy Travel Agency. They have a daughter, Eleanor Lee, born on 12 October 1999. Quan and Yu divorced on 3 January 2009 and share custody of their daughter.  Quan shared she has forgiven her ex-husband and they no longer have any animosity between them.

Filmography

Television

Films

Variety shows 
1992-2000 
River Hong Bao Show 环岛追追追能耐极限大挑战
President’s Star Charity 总统星光慈善
Pioneer Aisa KTV Contest
1993 
Star Search 1993 才华横溢出新秀
1995 
Star Search Final 1995才华横溢出新秀
2000-2004 
Amazing Grace 有心仁事
Dream Challengers圆梦心计划
AHA! 拉票超人王
Food Train 食在必行
Ready Steady Go 全民出动抢鲜玩
Happy Rules开心就好
‘Live’Unlimited 综艺无界限
The Next Big Thing 全民偶像新登场
Do Re Mi 发搜搜搜
Ultimate Tastebud 食在好吃
Mall & More 夺宝三响炮
Ready Steady Go 2 全民出动抢鲜玩2
2003-2004
Ren Ci Charity Show 2003-2004 仁心慈爱照万千
2005
Ren Ci Charity Show 2005 仁心慈爱照万千
Chingay Parade of Dreams 装艺大游行之奇思梦想
Lunar New Year Show 天鸡报喜贺新春
Condo & The City 寓望城市
Cenosis Beauty Quest 3 苗条淑女争风采之瘦身后
Superhost 超级主持人
Cenosis Beauty Quest 2 苗条淑女争风采之瘦身前
NKF Cancer Show 1 风雨同舟献真心
Project Superstar 绝对Superstar
What Women Want 2X 真女人
NKF Charity Show 1 群星照亮千万心之星光璀璨爱相随
NKF Charity Show 2 群星照亮千万心之星光荟萃展豪情
Shoot! 有话就说
Love Bites 缘来就是你
Life Scent 花花都市
2006
Lunar New Year Eve Special 2006 吉祥灵犬庆新春
Ren Ci Charity Show 2006 仁心慈爱照万千
Seeking The Right One 选好就结婚
THK Charity Show 一心一德为善乐
May Day Concert
Shoot2 有话就说
Starry Starry Night 2006 中新歌会-非常新加坡燃情之夜
What's Art 什么艺思?
Project Superstar 绝对Superstar
Star Chef 名厨玩味
2007
Giant Stars 2007 Giant 星光灿烂
SuperSavers 省省赢家赢新年
Lunar New Year Eve Special 2007 金猪贺岁庆肥年
Chingay Parade of Dreams 妆艺大#行之奇思梦想
Wonder Baby 无敌宝宝擂台赛
King of Thrift Smart省钱王
Numbers Game 数战速决
Ren Ci Charity Show 2007 仁心慈爱照万千
THK Charity Show 一心一德为善乐
The ABC's of Water 洁净所能水中乐
When Cupid Strikes Hello 有缘人
Maria is not at home Maria 今天不在家
Be A Giant Star - Society for Physically Disbled charity show 星光灿烂 - 真情无障爱 2007
Shoot III 有话就说III
Star Search 2007 才华横溢出新秀
Law by Law 赢了Law
Good Food Fun Cook 餐餐宝餐餐好
OSIM iGift uHealthy OSIM送礼更健康
25 Star Awards 2007 - 25th Drama Anniversary show 红星大奖之戏剧情牵
Star Awards 2007 红星大奖 2007
2008
SPOP Hurray! S-POP万岁
Buzzing Cashier 抢摊大行动
Have A Giant Fun Time
King of Thrift 2 Smart省钱王2
Celebritea Break
Follow me to Glamour
Life Transformers 心晴大动员
2009
Lunar New Year Special Show 2009
Gotcha, Kids! 娃娃看世界
Celebritea Talk Show II
Buzzing Cashier 抢摊大行动
Housewive Pte Ltd 主妇的春天
Life Transformer 2 心晴大动员2
King of Thrift III Smart 省钱王3
King of Thrift Goes Overseas 省钱王出城记
Star Awards 2009
2010
Giant Fortune Festival 2010! 爱上Giant过肥年2010！
Lunar New Year Special Show 2010
Black Rose S1 爆料黑玫瑰
KFC Breakfast KFC 早餐大比拼
Thong Chai Charity 2010
Star Awards 2010
Life Navigator 从心开始
Star Search 2010
New Citybeat 2 城人新杂志2
Buzzing Cashier 2 抢摊大行动2
2011
Giant Fortune Festival 2011! 爱上Giant过肥年2011！
Power Duet K歌2击队 
Show Me The Money 钱哪里有问题
Dietary Errors 饮食误区
Love On The Plate 名厨出走记 2 之重新出发
Star Awards 2011
2012
Star Reunion 那些年,我们一起看电视
Simply Exquisite 食分高下
Love In Progress 爱. 进行中
I Love I like i不释手
2013
Giant Fortune Festival 2013! 爱上Giant过肥年2013！
Laughing Out Loud 笑笑没烦恼
Shoot It! 哪里出问题?
Star Awards 2013
Finding U 寻U先锋
Stir it Up! 电视拌饭
Foodie Dash 美食大赢家3
Are You Up For It? 大明星你行吗?
Let’s Cook 全民新煮艺
2014
Giant Fortune Festival 2014! 爱上Giant过肥年2014！
Chinese New Year Eve Show 2014 骏马奔腾喜迎春 2014
Finding 8 先锋争8战
Black Rose S2 爆料黑玫瑰
Shoot It! 2 哪里出问题? 2 之食在有问题
Where to Stay? 到底住哪里？
Round and Round We Go 公子爱挑战
What Your School Doesn't Teach You 学校没教的事
Ladies Nite S3 女人聚乐部
Celebrity Bazaar 星货我来卖 
Star Awards 20
2015
Giant Fortune Festival 2015! 爱上Giant过肥年2015！
Neighbourhood Chef 2 邻里厨王2
Chinggay 2015 妆艺大游行2015 
SPD Charity Show 2015 真情无障爱 2015
Star Awards 2015
Leave It All To Me 今天我代班
Home Away From Home 异乡。驿客
The Courts Show 家家有COURTS赢奖乐
Toggle Talk Toggle星客驾到
Celeb's Curated Collections 名人。心货 
2016
Giant Fortune Festival 2016! 爱上Giant过肥年2016！
Lion Charity Show 2016 情牵白首爱不息
The 4 Chefs 四大名厨
Mars VS Venus II 金星火星大不同 II
Markets in Asia 游市集
Hearts and Hugs 爱心72小时
Closet Secrets 衣橱密语
Your Thoughts Please 好说快说一起说
2017
Giant Fortune Festival 2017! 爱上Giant过肥年2017！
Hearts and Hugs 爱心72小时 
Unique Lodging 不一样的旅店
Take A Break! 说走就走 短假游
Chinese New Year Eve Show 2017 咕鸡咕鸡庆丰年 2017
SPD Charity Show 2017 真情无障爱 2017
Fixer 线人 
My Star Guide 12 我的明星是导游 12
Hear My Thoughts 混口饭吃而已
2018
Thrift Hunters 我赚到了 
Play House 室内新玩家 
Voices 听我说 
Fixer 2 线人2
Star Awards 2018
Taste of Nanyang 翻乡找味
SPOP Sing! SPOP 听我唱!
2019
Old Taste Detective 古早味侦探 
Beyond the Cameras 我是媒体人 
Fixer 3 线人3
My Star Guide 14 我的明星是导游 14
Lunar New Year's Eve Special 2019
SPD Charity Show 2019 真情无障爱 2019
The Destined One 众里寻一
Star Awards 2019
2020
Hear U Out 权听你说
YiFong & Eleanor's Kitchen 怡凤和妹妹的厨房
2021
Star Awards 2021
Hear U Out S2 权听你说2

Awards and nominations

References

External links
Official Website

Living people
1974 births
Taiwanese television actresses
Taiwanese television personalities
Taiwanese emigrants to Singapore
Actresses from Taipei